Diphlebia nymphoides is a species of Australian damselfly in the family Lestoideidae,
commonly known as an arrowhead rockmaster. 
It is endemic to eastern Australia, where it inhabits streams and rivers.

Diphlebia nymphoides is a large, solid-looking damselfly; the adult male is a brilliant blue colour with a black and blue striped tail, while the female has a more muted colouring. It sits with its lightly tinted wings spread out.

Gallery

See also
 List of Odonata species of Australia

References 

Lestoideidae
Odonata of Australia
Insects of Australia
Endemic fauna of Australia
Taxa named by Robert John Tillyard
Insects described in 1912
Damselflies